The 2016–17 Villanova Wildcats women's basketball team represented Villanova University in the 2016–17 NCAA Division I women's basketball season. The Wildcats, led by thirty-ninth year head coach Harry Perretta, played their games at The Pavilion and are members of the Big East Conference. They finished the season 20–15, 11–7 in Big East play to finish in a tie for fourth place. They lost in the quarterfinals of the Big East women's tournament to St. John's. They were invited to the Women's National Invitation Tournament where they defeated Princeton, Drexel and James Madison in the first, second and third rounds, Indiana in the quarterfinals before losing to Michigan in the semifinals.

Roster

Schedule

|-
!colspan=9 style="background:#013974; color:#67CAF1;"| Exhibition

|-
!colspan=9 style="background:#013974; color:#67CAF1;"| Regular season

|-
!colspan=9 style="background:#013974; color:#67CAF1;"| Big East Women's Tournament

|-
!colspan=9 style="background:#013974; color:#67CAF1;"| WNIT

See also
 2016–17 Villanova Wildcats men's basketball team

References

Villnova
Villanova Wildcats women's basketball seasons
Villanova
Villanova
2017 Women's National Invitation Tournament participants